Frederick Frank Jarvis CBE (8 September 1924 – 15 June 2020) was a British trade union leader. He was President of the National Union of Students (NUS) from 1952 to 1954 and General Secretary of the National Union of Teachers (NUT) from 1975 to 1989. Jarvis served as President of the Trades Union Congress in 1987, the first Oxford graduate to hold that position.

Early life and education
Jarvis was born in West Ham, at that time in Essex but now part of the London Borough of Newham, into a working class family. He retained his Cockney accent as an adult. As a child, he attended Plaistow Secondary School in what was then the County Borough of West Ham in Essex. His father worked in a flour mill. His mother believed in the importance of education for her sons. At the start of World War II, the family moved to Wallasey where he attended Wallasey Grammar School and joined the Progressive Youth Movement.

Later in the war, he joined the Army, taking part in the Normandy landings.

In 1947, he attended University of Liverpool for a Diploma in Social Sciences, and went on to obtain a BA (Hons) in Philosophy, Politics and Economics at St Catherine's College, Oxford. He married Anne Colegrove, herself a vice-president of the NUS, in 1954.

Political activity
In 1951, Jarvis fought the safely-Conservative seat of Wallasey on behalf of the Labour Party, and lost to the incumbent, Ernest Marples, by 15,705 votes.

Personal life
Jarvis was married to the former Anne Colegrove from 1954 to her death in 2007. They had two children.

Jarvis was a lifelong supporter of West Ham United Football Club.

A keen photographer, Jarvis had an exhibition of his work at the TUC Centre in 2010 in aid of the North London Hospice.

In 2014 he published his autobiography You Never Know Your Luck.

Jarvis was appointed Commander of the Order of the British Empire (CBE) in the 2015 New Year Honours.

Jarvis died on 15 June 2020 at the age of 95.

Fred and Anne Jarvis Award

Named after Jarvis and his late wife, the Fred and Anne Jarvis Award was established in 2007 and presented annually by the NUT. Originally for individuals outside the NUT who have campaigned tirelessly for children and young people, in 2017 the award was given to a NUT member. From 2019 the award has been presented by the National Education Union, which has succeeded the NUT.

Winners include writers Robin Alexander, Melissa Benn, Alan Gibbons and Fiona Millar, former child prodigy Dr Anne-Marie Imafidon MBE, England international footballer Marcus Rashford MBE, former Children's Laureate Michael Rosen and Nobel Peace prize laureate Malala Yousafzai.

Footnotes

References
Biography, Who's Who

1924 births
2020 deaths
Alumni of St Catherine's College, Oxford
Alumni of the University of Liverpool
British Army personnel of World War II
Commanders of the Order of the British Empire
Comprehensive education
General Secretaries of the National Union of Teachers
Labour Party (UK) people
Members of the General Council of the Trades Union Congress
People from West Ham
People from Wallasey
Place of death missing
Presidents of the National Union of Students (United Kingdom)
Presidents of the Trades Union Congress
British Army soldiers